= Louise Bradley =

British interior designer

- Citizenship: British
- Occupations: Interior designer, business owner.
- Years active: 1991–present
- Known for: Luxury residential interior design, high-end bespoke interiors, bespoke furniture design
- Style: Classic-contemporary interiors, emphasis on form and function, layered textures, neutral colour palette, bespoke furniture and natural materials
- Website: https://louisebradley.co.uk/

Louise Bradley is a British interior designer and the founder of her eponymous interior design and interior architecture studio based in Chelsea, London in 1991. and the practice offers interior architecture.

== Early life ==
Bradley grew up in Hampstead, north London, where her father owned an interiors boutique that continues to inspire her work. She began her career in fashion before moving into interior design. She later opened her first boutique, specialising in antiques and accessories, which formed the basis of her design studio.

According to Tatler, Bradley is a self-taught designer who developed her practice through early exposure to design and hands-on experience in retail and interior design.

== Career ==
Bradley opened her first showroom on Walton Street, Knightsbridge, in 1991, specialising in antiques and accessories. The offering expanded to include bespoke furniture, with pieces initially designed for individual client commissions later added to the commercial range.

== Design style and philosophy ==
=== Signature aesthetic ===
Bradley's work has been described by Architectural Digest India as "classic contemporary," combining antique and vintage pieces with contemporary elements. She favours muted, neutral colour palettes, with visual interest created through layered textures, lighting, and the placement of signature pieces rather than strong colour or pattern. Mirrors are a recurring feature in her interiors, often used to visually extend the proportions of a room.

Country & Town House described her work as reflecting "quiet luxury," noting the studio's preference for restrained elegance over decorative maximalism.

=== Design fundamentals ===
Bradley has said she prefers to design homes with longevity in mind, using natural materials that age well and furniture intended to last rather than following short-term trends.

Bradley describes her approach to design as being around four principles — scale, texture, function and reflection — which structure the chapters of her 2021 book, Interior: Louise Bradley. Scale is described as the relationship between a space and the objects within it, intended to create balance and proportion. Texture, which she calls the "sensory aspect of an interior," is treated as being as important to a room's atmosphere as colour, achieved through the interplay of different materials. The third principle, function, reflects her view that beauty and practicality are not in conflict, and that a space should remain usable for the people who inhabit it. Reflection refers to her use of reflective surfaces to alter the perceived light and proportions of a room.

=== Wellbeing ===
Writing for Country & Town House's "Great British Brands" feature, Bradley said she believes good design can improve not only the appearance of a space but also the mental and physical health of the people who use it.

=== Sources of inspiration ===
Bradley's childhood was spent largely in the countryside, an experience she has said continues to inform her work. As a keen walker, she has said time spent outdoors continues to shape her palette choices—muted, landscape-derived tones—and her preference for organic textures.

Travel is a key influence on her work, with inspiration drawn from diverse architecture and antique markets. A single antique piece will often serve as the creative focal point around which an entire room design is developed.

Bradley has cited Christian Dior as an influence.

== Furniture and fabric collection ==
The Louise Bradley Furniture Collection was introduced in 2005 and is updated annually. Bradley began designing bespoke furniture for individual projects, which subsequently led to the development of her own furniture collection in response to client demand.

Bradley launched a fabric collection at Decorex in 2024. It comprises 57 fabrics, including wools, cottons, velvets and organic flax linen described as certified free from synthetic fertilisers and herbicides.

== Publications ==
Interior: Louise Bradley was published by Merrell Publishers in September 2021 to mark the studio's thirtieth anniversary. The text was co-written with design journalist Helen Chislett. The book presents completed residential projects spanning three decades, including London townhouses, a loft apartment, several pieds-à-terre, a Victorian country house, villas in Kuwait, an Alpine ski chalet, and Bradley's own residences. It is structured around four themes — scale, texture, function and reflection — outlining Bradley's design approach alongside photography of her projects.#

In 2025, Country & Town House named her among its "Titans of Design" and included her in its annual "50 Finest Interior Designers" list. Her work has also been covered by House & Garden, Elle Decor India, The Sunday Times, and Forbes.
